Giovanni Corrieri (7 February 1920 – 22 January 2017) was an Italian professional road bicycle racer. Corrieri won 7 stages in the Giro d'Italia between 1947 and 1955.

Corrieri died on 22 January 2017 at the age of 96 in Prato, Tuscany.

Major results

1945
Giro della Provincia Di Reggio Calabria
1947
Giro d'Italia:
Winner stage 12
1948
Tour de France:
Winner stages 18 and 21
1949
Giro d'Italia:
Winner stages 10 and 19
1950
Tour de France:
Winner stage 5
1951
Giro d'Italia:
Winner stage 9
1952
Sassari - Cagliari
1953
Giro d'Italia:
Winner stage 7A
1954
Giro d'Italia:
Winner stage 9
1955
Giro d'Italia:
Winner stage 7

References

External links 

Official Tour de France results for Giovanni Corrieri

1920 births
2017 deaths
Italian male cyclists
Italian Tour de France stage winners
Italian Giro d'Italia stage winners
Sportspeople from Messina
Cyclists from Sicily